= Autovía A-364 =

Highway in Spain

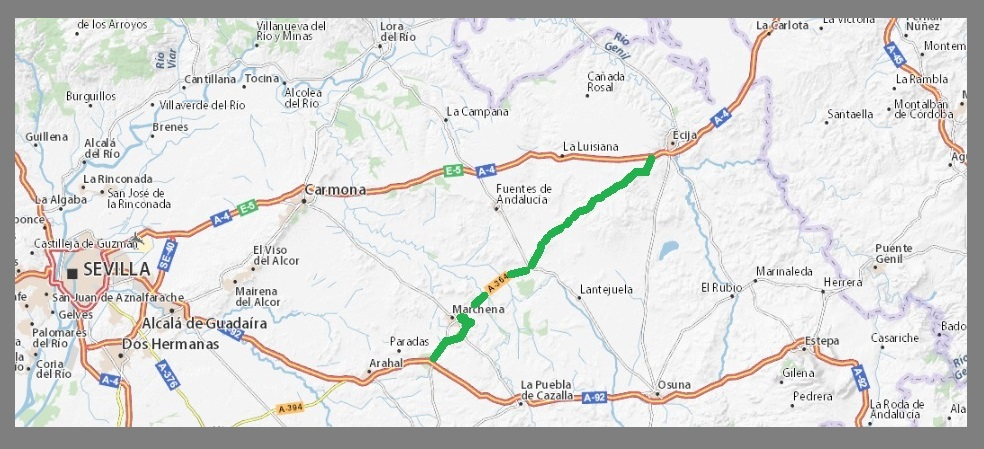
Outline of A-364, road in the province of Sevilla connecting A-92 and A-4

The Autovía A-364 is a highway in Spain. It passes through Andalusia.
